Bishnupur Lok Sabha constituency is one of the 543 parliamentary constituencies in India. The constituency centres on Bishnupur
in West Bengal. While six of the assembly seats of Bishnupur Lok Sabha constituency are in Bankura district, one assembly segment is in Purba Bardhaman district. The seat is reserved for scheduled castes.

Assembly segments

As per order of the Delimitation Commission issued in 2006 in respect of the delimitation of constituencies in the West Bengal, parliamentary constituency no. 37 Bishnupur (SC) is composed of the following segments:

Prior to delimitation, Vishnupur Lok Sabha constituency was composed of the following assembly segments:Taldangra (assembly constituency no. 244), Raipur (ST) (assembly constituency no. 245), Ranibandh (ST) (assembly constituency no. 246), Indpur (SC) (assembly constituency no. 247), Vishnupur (assembly constituency no. 253), Kotulpur (assembly constituency no. 254) and Indas (SC) (assembly constituency no. 255).

Members of Parliament

Election results

General election 2019
Source

General election 2014

General election 2009

General election 2004

General elections 1962-2004
Most of the contests were multi-cornered. However, only winners and runners-up are mentioned below:

In 1951 and 1957 Bankura Lok Sabha constituency, then covering the Bishnupur area also, had two seats with one reserved for Scheduled Castes

See also
 List of Constituencies of the Lok Sabha

External links
Bishnupur lok sabha  constituency election 2019 result details

References

Lok Sabha constituencies in West Bengal
Bankura district